Dry Rocks (or Key Largo Dry Rocks) is a coral reef located within the Florida Keys National Marine Sanctuary. It lies to the east of Key Largo, within the Key Largo Existing Management Area, which is immediately to the east of John Pennekamp Coral Reef State Park.  The reef lies within a Sanctuary Preservation Area (SPA).  It is close to Grecian Rocks and The Elbow.

A copy of the famous Christ of the Abyss statue is located at this reef.

This reef is distinct from White Banks Dry Rocks, which is landward of Molasses Reef and French Reef.

External links
 Benthic Habitat Map

References
 NOAA National Marine Sanctuary Maps, Florida Keys East
 NOAA Website on Dry Rocks
 NOAA Navigational Chart 11464

Coral reefs of the Florida Keys